Virginia Biddle (December 17, 1910 – February 21, 2003) was an American revue performer and showgirl. She was a regular performer in Florenz Ziegfeld's Follies shows until 1931.

In July 1931, Biddle sustained burns to her feet and ankles in the explosion of Harry Richman's yacht, the Chavalmar II. Her friend and fellow cast member in the 1931 Follies, Helen Walsh, was killed. Although she played the benefit performance of the Follies in Walsh's memory, Biddle ended her career on the stage in the wake of the accident, and her injuries also forced her to abandon dancing. She sued Richman for $50,000 damages but received only $50.

Biddle married twice and had three children, later forging a career as a realtor in Old Saybrook, Connecticut. In 2003, she suffered injuries in a car accident and died shortly afterwards.

Performances
Hot-Cha! (1932)
Ziegfeld Follies of 1931 (1931)
Smiles (1930–1931)
Rio Rita (1927–1928)

References

American showgirls
1910 births
2003 deaths
People from Old Saybrook, Connecticut
Ziegfeld girls
American female dancers
20th-century American women
21st-century American women